José Madariaga (born 23 May 1968) is a Mexican equestrian. He competed in two events at the 1996 Summer Olympics.

References

1968 births
Living people
Mexican male equestrians
Olympic equestrians of Mexico
Equestrians at the 1996 Summer Olympics
Place of birth missing (living people)